Curtisville may refer to the following places in the United States of America:

 Curtisville, Indiana
 Curtisville, Michigan
 Curtisville, Pennsylvania
 Old Curtisville Historic District, part of Stockbridge, Massachusetts